Payanam may refer to:

 Payanam (1976 film), an Indian Tamil film
 Payanam (2011 film), an Indian film
 Payanam, Tamil Nadu, a village in India.